Joseph Victor Fascione (5 February 1945 – 5 February 2019) was a Scottish footballer who played as a winger.

Career
A right sided winger, Fascione started out with Scottish junior side Kirkintilloch Rob Roy where he won the Scottish Junior Cup in 1962 – believed to be the youngest player to do so – before being signed for Londoners Chelsea by Tommy Docherty in September of that year. Fascione would remain with the club until 1969, but the presence of fellow wingers Bert Murray and Charlie Cooke ensured that he featured only sporadically in the first team, making a total of just 34 appearances. He was, however, one of the eight players infamously sent home by Docherty for breaking a pre-match curfew in Blackpool in April 1965.

Upon leaving Chelsea he signed for Durban City F.C. in South Africa in the summer of 1969. He returned to the UK in late 1971, but due to problems in having his playing registration released from South Africa was unable to sign for a club until July 1972. He then joined Dundee United on a trial basis but was released shortly afterwards, having only appeared in pre-season friendly matches.

He subsequently had spells with Romford in the Southern League, and Barking. He also had a stint as manager of the latter club.

He died on 5 February 2019, his 74th birthday.

References 

1945 births
2019 deaths
Association football midfielders
Barking F.C. managers
Barking F.C. players
Chelsea F.C. players
Dundee United F.C. players
Durban City F.C. players
English Football League players
Expatriate soccer players in South Africa
Kirkintilloch Rob Roy F.C. players
Footballers from Coatbridge
Romford F.C. players
Scottish expatriate footballers
Scottish expatriate sportspeople in South Africa
Scottish football managers
Scottish footballers
Scottish Junior Football Association players
Scottish people of Italian descent